Lemerig is an Oceanic language spoken on Vanua Lava, in Vanuatu. 

Lemerig is no longer actively spoken. The 2 remaining speakers live on the northern coast of the island. The language has receded in favour of its neighbours Mwotlap and Vera'a.

Name
The name Lemerig (spelled Lēmērig  in the local orthography) refers to a now abandoned village in northern Vanua Lava. Its name in Mwotlap is Lemyig . It is likely the name contains a descendant of the Proto-Torres-Banks word *riɣi meaning "small".

Dialects
Lemerig has sometimes been referred to using the names of its local varieties: Päk; Sasar; Alo-Teqel.

Judging from wordlists published by missionary and linguist Robert Codrington, these three varieties were very close to each other. The little differences there were went extinct during the 20th century.

Phonology
Lemerig has 11 phonemic vowels. These are all short monophthongs .

Grammar
The system of personal pronouns in Lemerig contrasts clusivity, and distinguishes four numbers (singular, dual, trial, plural).

Spatial reference in Lemerig is based on a system of geocentric (absolute) directionals, which is in part typical of Oceanic languages, in part innovative.

References

Bibliography

 .

 
.
 François, Alexandre & Taitus Sërortēlsöm. 2006. Nvāv ām a Lēmērig — Storian long lanwis blong Lemerig (Vanua Lava, Banks, Vanuatu). Collection of stories from the oral tradition, monolingual in Lemerig. Paris.

External links
 Audio recordings in the Lemerig language, in open access, by linguist A. François (Pangloss Collection). Features a presentation of the language, and pictures of some of the last speakers.

Languages of Vanuatu
Banks–Torres languages
Torba Province
Endangered Austronesian languages
Critically endangered languages